Julio Peralta and Horacio Zeballos were the defending champions, but chose to compete in Hamburg instead.

Oliver Marach and Philipp Oswald won the title, defeating Jonathan Eysseric and Franko Škugor in the final, 6–3, 4–6, [10–8].

Seeds

Draw

Draw

References
 Main Draw

Swiss Open Gstaad - Doubles
2017 Doubles